Graziella Marok-Wachter (nee Marok; born 4 May 1965) is a Liechtenstein politician from the Patriotic Union. She has been a member of the government of the Principality of Liechtenstein since 25 March 2021 as a member of the government responsible for the Ministry of Infrastructure and Justice.

Early life 
She was born in Mauren and graduated from the University of Zurich.

References 

Living people
1965 births
21st-century Liechtenstein women
Women government ministers of Liechtenstein

Patriotic Union (Liechtenstein) politicians
Female justice ministers
University of Zurich alumni